W. H. Sheldon may refer to:

William Herbert Sheldon (1898–1977), American psychologist
Wilmon Henry Sheldon (1875–1981), American philosopher